Amsterdam plane crash may refer to:

 1992 Amsterdam plane crash, when El Al Flight 1862 crashed into Bijlmermeer
 2009 Amsterdam plane crash, when Turkish Airlines Flight 1951 crashed north of the Polderbaan runway